Gosekhurd Dam, is an earthfill dam on the Wainganga River near Pauni in Bhandara district, in the state of Maharashtra in India. The dam contains 33 spillway gates to regulate water flow into the river for irrigation throughout the year.

Its purpose is irrigation and hydropower generation, as well as playing a role in systems for drinking water for the nearby Municipal Council as well as Grampanchayat. The dam was completed in 2008, and the Gosekhurd Reservoir began impounding water in 2009. Because of construction delays occurs due to Rehabilitation problems, the reservoir could not be filled to 100% capacity; the project was completed and the reservoir filled to 100% in Jan 2022.

See also
 List of dams and reservoirs in Maharashtra
 List of dams and reservoirs in India

References

Dams in Nagpur district
Earth-filled dams
Dams completed in 2008
2008 establishments in Maharashtra